The siege of Groenlo was a siege of Groenlo or Grol in 1606 during the Dutch Revolt. It lasted from 3 to 14 August 1606 and ended in the city being captured from the United Provinces by a Spanish Empire force under Ambrosio Spinola. A few months later Prince Maurice attempted to retake the city but failed due to poor planning and an intervention by Spinola. Groenlo would remain in Spanish hands until another siege in 1627.

See also 
 Íñigo de Borja, leader of the Antwerp garrison.

References

Bibliography

Groenlo
1606 in the Dutch Republic
1606 in the Habsburg Netherlands
17th-century military history of Spain
Eighty Years' War (1566–1609)
Groenlo (1606)
Groenlo (1606)
Groenlo (1606)
Groenlo
History of Oost Gelre